Jonathan Eric Kaplan is an American businessman and entrepreneur serving as the United States ambassador to Singapore since 2021. Kaplan was previously the chair of EducationSuperHighway, a non-profit organization based in San Francisco.

Education
Kaplan earned a Bachelor of Science degree in business administration and industrial management from Carnegie Mellon University.

Career

Corporate career 
After graduating from college, Kaplan worked for Condé Nast. He was later the vice president and general manager of Geoworks. He was also the founder and CEO of MovieStreet. Kaplan was the president and CEO of Sega.com and was the chairperson and CEO of Pure Digital Technologies. In his role, Kaplan invented and marketed the Flip Video before the company was acquired and shuttered by Cisco Systems. Most recently, Kaplan was the chairperson and CEO of the FishSix Restaurant Corporation, a holding company that owns several grilled cheese sandwich restaurants in California, Texas, and Colorado.

United States ambassador to Singapore 

On July 29, 2021, President Joe Biden nominated Kaplan to be the next United States ambassador to Singapore. The Senate Foreign Relations Committee held hearings on his nomination on October 20, 2021. The committee favorably reported Kaplan's nomination to the Senate floor on November 3, 2021. The entire Senate confirmed his nomination on November 19, 2021. On December 6, 2021, he presented his credentials as the United States Ambassador to Singaporean President Halimah Yacob.

References

External links

Living people
Ambassadors of the United States to Singapore
Businesspeople from California
Businesspeople from San Francisco
Carnegie Mellon University alumni
Year of birth missing (living people)